= 1967 Liechtenstein Alps referendum =

- 22 January 1967
- Referendum on a law protecting the Alpine region

Results
Choice	Votes	%
Yes	1,332	38.97%
No	2,086	61.03%
Valid votes	3,418	97.57%
Invalid or blank votes	85	2.43%
Total votes	3,503	100.00%
Registered voters/turnout	3,922	89.32%

A referendum on a law protecting the Alpine region was held in Liechtenstein on 22 January 1967. The proposal was rejected by 61.0% of voters.

== Results ==
Choice	Votes	%
For	1,332	39.0
Against	2,086	61.0
Invalid/blank votes	85	–
Total	3,503	100
Registered voters/turnout	3,922	89.3
Source: Nohlen & Stöver
